Brachionycha sajana is a moth of the family Noctuidae. It is found in Eastern Siberia and Irkutsk.

External links 
 Image

Psaphidinae
Moths described in 1934